Molecular Devices, LLC is a supplier of bioanalytical measurement systems for drug discovery and other life sciences research.

Company history
Founded in 1983, Molecular Devices introduced its first microplate reader in 1987 and since then has continually broadened its solution set through a combination of internal research and development efforts as well as strategic acquisitions. In 1996 Molecular Devices acquired the FLIPR technology from NovelTech Systems Inc. of Ann Arbor Michigan and in 2000 they licensed the IonWorks high-throughput electrophysiology system from Essen Bioscience also of Ann Arbor Michigan.  Molecular Devices then acquired Universal Imaging Corporation in 2002, Axon Instruments in 2004, and Blueshift Technologies in 2008, broadening its portfolio to include electrophysiology products, scanners and analysis software for microarrays, and workstations for cell-based screening using high-resolution imaging.

In March 2007, Molecular Devices was acquired by MDS, Inc. (Toronto, Canada) and became part of MDS Analytical Technologies. In February 2010, Danaher Corporation acquired MDS Analytical Technologies, and Molecular Devices, Inc. now operates within the Danaher Medical Technologies segment.

About Molecular Devices
Molecular Devices supplies analytical systems, including instruments, software, and reagents, to accelerate and improve drug discovery and basic life science research.

Molecular Devices is based in Silicon Valley, CA, United States, and has regional offices in the United Kingdom, Germany, Korea, China, and Japan to support the global life sciences—drug discovery and basic research—communities.

Products and services
Microplate Readers

ImageXpress Micro System is an instrument offering an inverted widefield microscope that comes in standard or XL models.

References

Biotechnology companies of the United States
Danaher subsidiaries
Companies based in Sunnyvale, California
Biotechnology companies established in 1983
American companies established in 1983
2007 mergers and acquisitions